Boštjan Kline (born 9 March 1991) is a Slovenian World Cup alpine ski racer, and specializes in the speed events of downhill and super-G. He has competed in four
World Championships, and the 2018 Winter Olympics.

Career
Kline made his World Cup debut in December 2009 in a super combined at Val d'Isere, France. He competed for Slovenia at the 2015 World Championships. He failed to finish the super-G, finished 33rd in the downhill, and was disqualified during the slalom run of the super combined.

In January 2016, Kline attained his first podium, a second-place finish in downhill at Garmisch-Partenkirchen, Germany, finishing behind Aleksander Aamodt Kilde. About a month later, he achieved a second place podium finish in Hinterstoder in the super G, again finishing behind Kilde.

He gained his first World Cup victory in Norway at Kvitfjell in a downhill in February 2017.

World Cup results

Standings through 17 January 2021

Race podiums
 1 win – (1 DH) 
 3 podiums – (2 DH, 1 SG)

World Championship results

Olympic results

References

External links
 
 Boštjan Kline World Cup standings at the International Ski Federation

Stöckli Skis – alpine racers – Bostjan Kline

1991 births
Slovenian male alpine skiers
Living people
Sportspeople from Maribor
Alpine skiers at the 2018 Winter Olympics
Alpine skiers at the 2022 Winter Olympics
Olympic alpine skiers of Slovenia